The Adventures and Misadventures of Maqroll (orig. Spanish  Empresas y Tribulaciones de Maqroll el Gaviero) is a compilation of novellas by Colombian author Álvaro Mutis. First published as a two-volume collection in Colombia in 1993, the work was translated into English by Edith Grossman in 2002. The novellas center on the exploits and adventures of Maqroll the Gaviero (gavia is Spanish for topsail, and gaviero is the  sailor in charge of the topsail, but there is also a pun with the word gavia which, like gaviota, also means seagull), and his travels on sea and on land across the world.

References

1993 novels
Colombian novellas